The Great September Gale of 1815 (the word "hurricane" was not yet current in American English) is one of five "major hurricanes" (Category 3 on the Saffir–Simpson hurricane scale) to strike New England since 1635. At the time it struck, the Great September Gale was the first hurricane to strike New England in 180 years.

After striking on Long Island, the hurricane caused major damage in Connecticut, Massachusetts, New Hampshire and Rhode Island. Rhode Island suffered the worst damage, as the storm surge flooded towns along Narragansett Bay up to and including Providence.

Origin
The hurricane first struck the Turks Islands near the Bahamas on September 20, with a strength estimated to have been equivalent to a Category 4 hurricane.

Impact

New York
The storm struck Long Island on September 23, 1815, probably coming ashore near Center Moriches (Ludlum) around 7:00 A.M. On the south shore of Long Island it broke through the barrier beach and created the inlet that still isolates Long Beach, which had previously been an eastward extension of The Rockaways.

Connecticut
Around 9:00 A.M. the storm came ashore at Saybrook, Connecticut with the force of what would now be considered a Category 3 hurricane. Waves of up to six feet were reported in New London.

Rhode Island

The "Great Storm" (or "Great Gale"), as it was known there, hit Providence, Rhode Island on the morning of September 23. From about 10:00 A.M. to noon, the storm delivered a storm surge that funneled up Narragansett Bay where it destroyed some 500 houses and 35 ships. Dozens of ships were deposited on the streets of Providence. The bowsprit of the ship "Ganges" was smashed into the third story of the Washington Insurance Company building. The Second Baptist Meeting House was destroyed. Most of the buildings on the east side from south of the Market House to India Point were destroyed.  At India Point, houses and wharves were destroyed. Both the Washington Bridge and the Central (Red) Bridge were uprooted from their piers and destroyed.

The rain appears to have been saturated with salt. The leaves on trees which were not blown away were covered with a white salt coating that resembled a light frost. Even houses turned white.

A line on the Old Market Building marks the  storm surge that was unsurpassed in the city until the 1938 New England hurricane, which brought a  storm surge. There is still a worn plaque on the Rhode Island Hospital Trust building (built in 1917), along with a newer plaque showing the higher 1938 hurricane water level. At Matunuck, Rhode Island, sediment studies have identified the overwash fan of sediments in Succotash Marsh, where the 1815 hurricane storm surge overtopped the barrier beach.

The financial loss was estimated at one and a half million dollars, one-quarter the total valuation of the city. Fortunately, only two people died, both in India Point.

After the storm, much of the Narragansett Bay area was rebuilt with higher riverbanks, raised wharves, and more durable building practices, to help protect against future storms.

Massachusetts
In Dorchester, Massachusetts, just south of Boston, local historian William Dana Orcutt wrote in the late 19th century of the hurricane's impact: "In 1815 there was a great gale which destroyed the arch of the bridge over the Neponset River. This arch was erected over the bridge at the dividing line of the towns [Dorchester and Milton] in 1798." Dorchester's First Parish Meeting House was too badly damaged to repair.

New Hampshire
The eye passed into New Hampshire near Jaffrey and Hillsborough.

Meteorology 
In the aftermath of the Great Gale, the concept of a hurricane as a "moving vortex" was presented by John Farrar, Hollis Professor of Mathematics and Natural Philosophy at Harvard University. In an 1819 paper he concluded that the storm "appears to have been a moving vortex and not the rushing forward of a great body of the atmosphere".

See also

 List of tropical cyclones
 List of Atlantic hurricanes
 List of New England hurricanes
 List of New Jersey hurricanes

References

Further reading

External links

 PBS: American Experience: Timeline of US storm disasters
 State of New Hampshire Hazard Mitigation Plans: Great September Gale of 1815
 NOAA: The Deadliest Atlantic Tropical Cyclones

Category 4 Atlantic hurricanes
1810s Atlantic hurricane seasons
Hurricanes in Massachusetts
Great September Gale
Great September Gale
Hurricanes in Rhode Island
Hurricanes in Connecticut
Hurricanes in New Hampshire
Hurricanes in New York (state)
Long Island
Hurricanes in New England
September 1815 events
1815 meteorology